"Moonlight" is MAX's 21st single on the Avex Trax label and was released on September 27, 2001. The title track was used as the ending theme to the variety program, Sukiyaki London Boots. Its b-side "Paradise Lost," was used as the theme song to the anime series, Kuru Kuru Amy.

Track list

Charts
Oricon Sales Chart (Japan)

References

2001 singles
MAX (band) songs
Songs written by Matt Bronleewe
2001 songs
Avex Trax singles